Masiphyini is a tribe of flies in the family Tachinidae.

Genera
Masiphya Brauer & von Bergenstamm, 1891
Mystacomyia Giglio-Tos, 1893

References

Diptera of North America
Exoristinae
Brachycera tribes